Save the Dunes Conservation Fund, originally known as Save the Dunes Council, is a 501(c)(3) nonprofit organization in Northwest Indiana whose mission is to preserve, protect and restore the Indiana dunes and all natural resources in Northwest Indiana’s Lake Michigan Watershed.

History
The Save the Dunes council was established in June 1952 by Dorothy Richardson Buell when 21 women met at her home to create what became the campaign to establish the Indiana Dunes National Lakeshore. Their credo was, "We are prepared to spend the rest of our lives, if necessary, to save the Dunes".  Indiana Representative Charles A. Halleck aggressively challenged the council and their ally, Illinois Senator, Paul Douglas. Halleck carried an unwavering support for creating a port on the Lakeshore which would have removed the large central dunes of the Indiana Dunes. The battle between Douglas and Halleck ended in compromise, with the Port of Indiana being created and the authorization of the Indiana Dunes National Lakeshore.

As a result of the more than century-long advocacy effort, on February 15, 2019, the Indiana Dunes National Lakeshore became the Indiana Dunes National Park—the first national park in Indiana, and the country's 61st. 

In partnership with Hitchcock Design Group, Save the Dunes published Living in the Dunes, a homeowner's guide to landscaping in the Dunes, to help landowners protect their parts of the landscape. It won a 2018 Honor Award from the American Society for Landscape Architects.

The organization alo participates in the Monarch Music Fest.

References

External links
Save the Dunes

Nature conservation organizations based in the United States
Organizations established in 1981
Nature reserves in Indiana
Protected areas of LaPorte County, Indiana
Protected areas of Porter County, Indiana
Protected areas of Lake County, Indiana